Hawick Harlequins Rugby Football Club are a Scottish Rugby Union team. Based in Hawick, Scotland they play in the East Regional Leagues. They also played at Murrayfield Stadium in 2002 when they reached the final of the BT Bowl competition, losing to Ellon RFC.

Notable players
Jim Renwick, capped 52 times for Scotland

See also
Hawick RFC

References
 Massie, Allan A Portrait of Scottish Rugby (Polygon, Edinburgh)

External links
Official site.

Scottish rugby union teams
Rugby union clubs in the Scottish Borders
Hawick